Mistretta v. United States, 488 U.S. 361 (1989), is a case decided by the United States Supreme Court concerning the constitutionality of the United States Sentencing Commission.

Background
John Mistretta was indicted in the United States District Court for the Western District of Missouri for allegedly selling cocaine. He moved to have the United States Federal Sentencing Guidelines, which had been established under the Sentencing Reform Act of 1984, declared unconstitutional because it delegated excessive authority by Congress, resulting in a violation of separation of powers. After the motion was denied, Mistretta pleaded guilty to one count of conspiracy and agreement to sell cocaine. He was sentenced principally to serve 18 months in prison. He filed an appeal to the Eighth Circuit, but he and the government both petitioned for certiorari before judgment, and the Supreme Court granted the petitions.

Issues presented
Was Congress's creation of a United States Sentencing Commission with the power to establish binding sentencing guidelines a constitutional delegation of authority?

Decision
The Supreme Court held that the Commission and the guidelines represented a constitutional delegation of powers.

Justice Blackmun delivered the majority opinion. The Court held that, as society increases in complexity, Congress must delegate authority “under broad general directives." The broad delegation of power to the Commission was undoubtedly "sufficiently specific and detailed to meet constitutional requirements.”

Congress charged the commission with specific goals, identified specific purposes that sentencing was to serve, and prescribed a particular tool in the guidelines. That and other guidance that Congress provided ensured that the commission was steered by "more than merely an 'intelligible principle' or minimal standards."

Turning to the separation of powers question, the Supreme Court considered Mistretta's objections to the location of the commission inside the judicial branch, the composition of the commission and the president's ability to appoint and remove members of the commission but found none of these meritorious.

Dissent
Dissenting, Justice Scalia believed the commission to be an unconstitutional delegation of legislative power by Congress to another branch because the guidelines established by the Sentencing Commission have the force of law: a judge who disregards them will be reversed. Justice Scalia noted that the guidelines were "heavily laden (or ought to be) with value judgments and policy assessments" rather than being merely technical. He also disputed the assertion by the Court's majority that the Sentencing Commission was in the judicial branch rather than the legislative branch, writing that the Commission "is not a court, does not exercise judicial power, and is not controlled by or accountable to members of the Judicial Branch." Justice Scalia rejected the notion of an “independent agency” in the judicial branch because “unlike executive power, judicial and legislative powers have never been thought delegable. A judge may not leave the decision to his law clerk [and] Senators... may not send delegates to consider and vote upon bills in their place.” The case, he asserted, was not about “commingling” of constitutional powers “but about the creation of a new Branch altogether, a sort of junior varsity Congress.”

See also
 List of United States Supreme Court cases, volume 488
 List of United States Supreme Court cases
 Lists of United States Supreme Court cases by volume
 List of United States Supreme Court cases by the Rehnquist Court
 United States v. Booker (2005)
 Blakely v. Washington (2004)

External links
 

United States Constitution Article Three case law
United States Supreme Court cases
United States Federal Sentencing Guidelines case law
United States separation of powers case law
1989 in United States case law
United States Supreme Court cases of the Rehnquist Court
United States nondelegation doctrine case law